Lottie H. Shackelford (born April 30, 1941) is an American politician who became the first woman to be appointed Mayor of Little Rock, Arkansas in 1987.  In 1993, she was appointed to the Board of Directors of the Overseas Private Investment Corporation (OPIC) by President Bill Clinton, making her the first African American woman to serve in such a role. She is also the longest serving Vice Chair of the Democratic National Committee (DNC), having served for 20 years.

Biography

Education
Shackelford received a Bachelor of Arts degree in Business Administration from Philander Smith College in Little Rock, Arkansas. She was a Senior Fellow at the Arkansas Institute of Politics and a fellow at the John F. Kennedy School of Government, Harvard University.

Career
Shackelford's political career began in 1978 when she was elected to the Board of Directors for the city of Little Rock, Arkansas, and was re-elected citywide three times to that position before becoming the city's first woman Mayor. During her tenure in local government, Shackelford directed liaison activities for minority businesses and held leadership positions at the National League of Cities. Additionally, she presented papers on local government, economic development, and electoral politics, both nationally and internationally, and has led economic trade missions and conducted lecture tours in Europe, Asia, and Africa.

For the past several decades, Shackelford has worked with the Democratic Party at the state and national level.  She served as Secretary, Vice Chair, and Chair of the Arkansas State Democratic Committee, and was elected Secretary of the National Association of State Democratic Chairs. She was the first woman and second African American to serve as Mayor of Little Rock, Arkansas, from January 1987 to December 1988. A member of the DNC,  since the early 1980;s, Ms. Shackelford served as Co-Chair of the Platform Committee in 1984 and of the Rules Committee in 1988, and currently serves on the Resolutions Committee.

Shackelford was appointed Co-Chair of the 1988 Democratic National Convention, held in Atlanta, Georgia. She has been a Delegate to every Democratic National Convention since 1980.

Shackelford's political experience at the national level also includes advising presidential candidates, working on White House transition teams, and representing the administration abroad. In 1992, she was a Deputy Campaign manager for the Clinton/Gore Presidential Campaign and was later appointed Co-Director of Intergovernmental Affairs for the Clinton Transition Team.  In 1993, President Clinton appointed Shackelford a US Delegate to the United Nations Commission on the Status of Women, Vienna, Austria.

In her role as DNC Vice Chair of Voter Registration and Participation, Shackelford travels across the country and around the world, sharing the Democratic Party's message and engaging voters in the political process. She regularly participates in political forums of other countries, including Azerbaijan, Russia, West Germany and Taiwan, and has observed elections in Romania and the Baltic States.

Shackelford is Senior Executive Vice President of Global USA, Inc., and is a member of various civic and community organizations, including the National Urban League, National Association for the Advancement of Colored People (NAACP), Delta Sigma Theta sorority and The Links, Incorporated.  She has an extensive record of serving on numerous boards and commissions, and is currently on the Board of Directors of Medicis Pharmaceutical Corporation, Phoenix, Arizona.

Awards
Registry of Outstanding Men and Women, Esquire Magazine
Woman of the Year, Arkansas Democrat newspaper
1993: Arkansas Black Hall of Fame inductee
1998: Mary Church Terrell Award, Delta Sigma Theta
2016: Arkansas Women's Hall of Fame inductee

References

External links
 Democratic National Committee Biography
 

African-American people in Arkansas politics
Women mayors of places in Arkansas
Arkansas Democrats
Mayors of Little Rock, Arkansas
Philander Smith College alumni
Harvard Kennedy School people
Living people
Women in Arkansas politics
Delta Sigma Theta members
1941 births
21st-century African-American people
21st-century African-American women
20th-century African-American people
20th-century African-American women
African-American mayors in Arkansas
African-American women mayors